Harold Budd (born May 24, 1936 - December 7, 2020) was an American ambient/avant-garde composer and poet. Born in Los Angeles, he was raised in the Mojave Desert.

His discography consists of sixteen studio albums, one EP, two live albums, three soundtrack albums and several collaborations with other artists. His first recording The Oak of the Golden Dreams / Coeur D'Orr was released in 1971, but subsequently Budd didn't release anything until Brian Eno released The Pavilion of Dreams on his Obscure Records label in 1978. Since then he has been a prolific recording artist.

Eno produced his second album The Pavilion of Dreams and they worked together in collaboration on Ambient 2:The Plateaux of Mirror in 1980 and followed it in 1984 with The Pearl. In 1986 he worked with Cocteau Twins on The Moon and the Melodies, and subsequently he has worked  frequently with Robin Guthrie on several albums including  soundtracks to the films Mysterious Skin and White Bird in a Blizzard. Other frequent collaborators include Hector Zazou, John Foxx and Clive Wright amongst others.

This article contains information related to his recordings.

Studio albums

Live albums

Compilation albums

EPs

Soundtracks

Collaborative albums

Guest appearances

Production

Ephemera
 The indie rock band Rothko has a song titled "Harold Budd" on their album In the Pulse of An Artery (which uses a sample from Budd's "Boy About 10" from his album By the Dawn's Early Light.)
 Harold Budd and Eugene Bowen contributed the track "Wonder's Edge" to the Cold Blue label compilation.
 The Harold Budd track "Balthus Bemused By Colour" from his album The White Arcades is included as part of the 70 Minutes of Madness DJ mix by Coldcut.
 On saxophonist Marion Brown's 1975 album Vista, Harold Budd plays celeste and gong on the track "Bismillahi 'Rrahmani 'Rrahim", a shorter version of the same composition on Budd's 1978 album The Pavilion of Dreams (which also includes Marion Brown as saxophone soloist).
 In 1961, while in the military, Harold Budd briefly played drums in an Army band with legendary avant-garde saxophonist Albert Ayler.
 The track "Subtext" from Budd's album Translucence with John Foxx features in the film Inside I'm Dancing (Momentum Pictures, June 2004)

See also
 Electronic music
 Experimental music
 List of ambient music artists

References

External links

 
 

Discographies of American artists
Electronic music discographies